The men's pole vault event at the 2009 Asian Athletics Championships was held at the Guangdong Olympic Stadium on November 11.

Results

References
Results

2009 Asian Athletics Championships
Pole vault at the Asian Athletics Championships